The 2016 season was Southern Vipers' first season, in which they competed in the Women's Cricket Super League, a Twenty20 competition. The side finished top of the initial group stage, therefore progressing straight to the final, where they played against Western Storm. They went on to win the final by 7 wickets with 7 balls to spare to become the inaugural winners of the WCSL.

The side represented the South of England, and was partnered with Hampshire County Cricket Club, Sussex County Cricket Club, Berkshire County Cricket Club, Dorset County Cricket Club, Oxfordshire County Cricket Club, Wiltshire County Cricket Club, the Isle of Wight Cricket Board and Southampton Solent University. They played their home matches at the Rose Bowl. Southern Vipers' coach was Nicholas Denning, and they were captained by Charlotte Edwards.

Squad
Southern Vipers announced a 15-player squad on 21 April 2016. Megan Schutt and Daisy Gardner were originally named in the squad, but were both ruled out due to injury and replaced by Morna Nielsen and Linsey Smith, respectively. Age given is at the start of Southern Vipers' first match of the season (31 July 2016).

Women's Cricket Super League

Season standings

 Advanced to the Final.
 Advanced to the Semi-final.

League stage

Final

Statistics

Batting

Bowling

Fielding

Wicket-keeping

References

Southern Vipers seasons
2016 in English women's cricket